Fenmetramide is a drug which was patented as an antidepressant by McNeil Laboratories in the 1960s. The drug was never marketed. It is the 5-ketone derivative of phenmetrazine and would similarly be expected to produce psychostimulant effects, though pharmacological data is lacking.

See also 
 Fenbutrazate
 Phendimetrazine
 Phenmetrazine

References 

Antidepressants
Lactams
Substituted amphetamines
Phenylmorpholines
Stimulants
Norepinephrine-dopamine releasing agents
Abandoned drugs